Khasynsky District is an administrative district (raion), one of the eight in Magadan Oblast, Russia. As a municipal division, it is incorporated as Khasynsky Urban Okrug. Its administrative center is the urban locality (an urban-type settlement) of Palatka. As of the 2010 Census, the total population of the district was 8,141, with the population of Palatka accounting for 52.1% of that number.

Geography
It is located in the south of the oblast and borders Yagodninsky and Srednekansky Districts in the north, Omsukchansky and Olsky Districts in the east, the territory of the town of oblast significance of Magadan in the south, and Olsky and Tenkinsky Districts in the west. Rivers Buyunda, Bakhapcha and Maltan flow northwards across the district at the western end of the Kolyma Mountains, in the area near the Upper Kolyma Highlands. The Arman, the Khasyn and the Yama flow southwards. The main mountain range in the district is the Maymandzhin Range.

History
The district was established on December 30, 1966 from parts of the territories of the town of Magadan and Yagodninsky and Tenkinsky Districts, and was named after the Khasyn River.

Administrative and municipal status
Within the framework of administrative divisions, Khasynsky District is one of the eight in the oblast. The urban locality (an urban-type settlement) of Palatka serves as its administrative center.

As a municipal division, the district has been incorporated as Khasynsky Urban Okrug since May 1, 2015. Prior to that date, the district was incorporated as Khasynsky Municipal District, which was subdivided into four urban settlements and one rural settlement.

References

Notes

Sources

Districts of Magadan Oblast
States and territories established in 1966